Nasi may refer to:

Food

Dishes
Nasi Goreng is an Indonesian and Malay word for cooked rice, featured in many Southeast Asian dishes
Nasi goreng, a popular rice dish often simply called nasi
Other Southeast Asian nasi dishes:
Nasi ambeng
Nasi bakar
Nasi bogana
Nasi campur
Nasi dagang
Nasi goreng jawa
Nasi goreng pattaya
Nasi gurih
Nasi jamblang
Nasi kapau
Nasi kari
Nasi kebuli
Nasi kerabu
Nasi kucing
Nasi kuning
Nasi lemak
Nasi lengko
Nasi liwet
Nasi mandi
Nasi minyak
Nasi padang
Nasi paprik
Nasi pecel
Nasi tempong
Nasi tim
Nasi timbel
Nasi tutug oncom
Nasi tumpang
Nasi tumpeng
Nasi uduk
Nasi ulam

Restaurant
Pelita Nasi Kandar, a Malaysian restaurant chain

Religion
Nasi (Hebrew title), meaning prince in Biblical Hebrew and president in Modern Hebrew
Nasi', an Islamic concept mentioned in the Qur'an

People
Nasi Manu, a New Zealand professional rugby player
Nasi (singer), a Brazilian singer
Arnaldo Ferrari Nasi, an Italian sociologist, journalist and political analyst
Carlo Nasi, an Italian sailor
Gracia Mendes Nasi, a wealthy Jewish woman in Renaissance Europe and the aunt of Joseph Nasi
Guglielmo Nasi, an Italian General during World War II
Joseph Nasi, an Ottoman Court Jew, diplomat and administrator

Other
nāsī, term for a Dravidian form of gavaksha in Hindu temple architecture 
Palazzo Nasi, Florence, a late medieval Italian palace
Nasi (Caphyatis), a village in Arcadian Azania in ancient Arcadia, Greece, on the river Tragus
Nasi (Cleitoria), a village in ancient Arcadia, Greece, on the river Ladon
Näsijärvi, a Finnish lake that is also called Lake Nasi
1534 Näsi, a main belt asteroid
"nasi-", used in medical Latin for something relating to the nose

See also
Nashi (disambiguation)
Nazi (disambiguation)